Aholou is a surname. Notable people with the surname include:

 Hélène Aholou Keke, Beninese lawyer and politician
 Jean-Eudes Aholou (born 1994), Ivorian footballer
 Kouame Aholou (born 1970), Togolese sprinter
 Roger Aholou (born 1993), Ivorian footballer 

Surnames of African origin